The 2017 O'Reilly Auto Parts 500 was a Monster Energy NASCAR Cup Series race held on April 9, 2017, at Texas Motor Speedway in Fort Worth, Texas. Contested over 334 laps on the 1.5-mile (2.4 km) intermediate quad-oval, it was the seventh race of the 2017 Monster Energy NASCAR Cup Series season.

Report

Background

Texas Motor Speedway is a speedway located in the northernmost portion of the U.S. city of Fort Worth, Texas – the portion located in Denton County, Texas. The track measures  around and is banked 24 degrees in the turns, and is of the oval design, where the front straightaway juts outward slightly. The track layout is similar to Atlanta Motor Speedway and Charlotte Motor Speedway (formerly Lowe's Motor Speedway). The track is owned by Speedway Motorsports, Inc., the same company that owns Atlanta and Charlotte Motor Speedways, as well as the short-track Bristol Motor Speedway.

Entry list

First practice
During the session, Chase Elliott and Erik Jones sustained terminal damage to their cars in wrecks that required them to switch to backup cars.

Qualifying

Qualifying results

Practice (post-qualifying)

Second practice

Final practice

Race

First stage
Kevin Harvick led the field to the green flag at 1:49 p.m., but the race was slowed when the first caution flew on the third lap for debris on the frontstretch.

The race restarted on the sixth lap. The second caution flew on lap 10 for a three-car wreck in Turn 2 involving Jeffrey Earnhardt, Gray Gaulding and Reed Sorenson. Austin Dillon, who took his car to the garage prior to the initial start for a broken track bar and upper control arm, returned to the race 12 laps down. He said after the race that when he "made a pace lap before the race I could feel something was broken. We had to go into the garage and make repairs before we could even start the race."

On the lap 16 restart, Ryan Blaney edged out Harvick exiting Turn 2 to take the lead. The third caution, a scheduled competition caution, flew on lap 31. Kyle Larson was busted for driving through too many pit boxes and restarted the race from the tail end of the field. A crew member of Chris Buescher's team, jackman Zack Young, was injured when Buescher's car was clipped by the 77 of Erik Jones, spinning him into his pit box.

The race restarted on lap 37 and stayed green the remainder of the stage until Blaney won the first stage and the fourth caution flew on lap 85 for the stage conclusion. Martin Truex Jr. exited pit road with the race lead.

Second stage
On the lap 93 restart, Truex got loose going into Turn 1 and Blaney retook the lead. Debris in Turn 2, a piece of bare bond, brought out the fifth caution on lap 121.

The race restarted on lap 127. Debris in Turn 1, another piece of bare bond, brought out the sixth caution on lap 163. Coming seven laps prior to the end of the stage, all but the first seven cars opted to pit.

The race restarted on lap 167. Blaney won the second stage and the seventh caution flew for the end of the stage. The seven cars that stayed out under the previous caution, Blaney among them, pitted under this caution. Harvick, who pitted during the sixth caution, assumed the lead.

Final stage

The race restarted on lap 178. A number of cars hit pit road around lap 219 to start a cycle of green flag pit stops. Harvick pitted from the lead the following lap, giving the lead to Brad Keselowski. He pitted on lap 224 and teammate Joey Logano took the lead. He pitted with 107 laps to go and Truex cycled to the lead.

Another round of green flag stops took place with 62 to go. Truex pitted from the lead with 61 to go. Jimmie Johnson pitted from the lead with 60 to go. Logano held the lead for 15 laps before pitting with 45 to go and Harvick cycled to the lead.

Debris in Turn 3 brought out the eighth caution with 35 to go. Everyone pitted except Logano who stayed out to assume the race lead. Blaney, who worked his way back into the top-10, slid through his pit stall and fell back through the running order. He said after the race he "got to eighth or something like that before the last caution, and I slid through our pit box, and that was an unfortunate deal. We were kind of pinned in between the 4 and the 88 and there was a weird angle. I just stopped a little deep, and I hurt us on that one for sure.”

The race restarted with 30 to go. Johnson edged out Logano to take the lead with 16 to go and held off Larson in the final laps to drive on to score the victory.

Post-race

Driver comments
“I guess I remembered how to drive, and I guess this team remembered how to do it,” Johnson said in victory lane. “I'm just real proud of this team. What a tough track and tough conditions. We were really in our wheelhouse and we were just able to execute all day.”

After his victory lane interviews, Johnson went to the infield care center to receive three bags of IV fluid because the fluid system in his car malfunctioned in the closing laps.

Dale Earnhardt Jr., who earned his first top-five finish since a runner-up finish in the 2016 Axalta "We Paint Winners" 400 at Pocono Raceway, said he "figured we'd get one sooner or later, but it's nice. I know our fans are pulling for us. Could have finished a little better, but we'll take a top five."

Blaney – who led a race high of 148 laps, the first time a Wood Brothers Racing entry has led over 100 laps since 1982 – said, when asked about staying out vs. pitting in the caution prior to the end of the second stage, it's easy to "say, oh, we should have done this, should have done that. Now I say we should have stayed out the last caution and might have had a better shot at it. But you can't really change any of that now. Yeah, in hindsight that was kind of a judgment call. You give up a stage win and 10 point and a bonus point for the playoffs to try to set yourself for the end of the race. We thought we had enough time after segment 2 to try to work our way back up through there, and a restart actually after segment 2 really went bad for us. We got jumbled up in 1 and 2 and let a lot of cars get by. That was kind of the deciding factor I feel like. I let a lot of good cars get by like the 48 and 42 and 24, and that hurt us more, I think, than anything was that restart after segment 2 when we had to check up big in 1 and 2. I thought we made the right call to stay out there and try to win that segment. I'm for that.”

Race results

Stage results

Stage 1
Laps: 85

Stage 2
Laps: 85

Final stage results

Stage 3
Laps: 164

Race statistics
 Lead changes: 6 among different drivers
 Cautions/Laps: 8 for 35
 Red flags: 0
 Time of race: 3 hours, 24 minutes and 18 seconds
 Average speed:

Media

Television
Fox Sports covered their 17th race at the Texas Motor Speedway. Mike Joy, 2009 race winner Jeff Gordon and Darrell Waltrip had the call in the booth for the race. Jamie Little, Vince Welch and Matt Yocum handled the pit road duties for the television side.

Radio
The race was broadcast on radio by the Performance Racing Network and simulcast on Sirius XM NASCAR Radio.

Standings after the race

Drivers' Championship standings

Manufacturers' Championship standings

Note: Only the first 16 positions are included for the driver standings.
. – Driver has clinched a position in the Monster Energy NASCAR Cup Series playoffs.

References

O'Reilly Auto Parts 500
O'Reilly Auto Parts 500
2010s in Fort Worth, Texas
O'Reilly Auto Parts 500
NASCAR races at Texas Motor Speedway